Cranes are a British rock band formed in 1985.

History
Formed in 1985 in Portsmouth, England by siblings Alison and Jim Shaw and named after the many mechanical cranes around the city's docks, Cranes are best known for the singular childlike vocals of lead singer Alison.

The band's first release was the self-financed Fuse cassette. Signing with Portsmouth based independent label Bite Back!, Cranes recorded the Self Non Self mini-LP in 1989, which led to them recording their first of two sessions for John Peel's BBC Radio 1 show. They moved to the BMG offshoot Dedicated Records in 1990. With the addition of Mark Francombe and Matt Cope (both guitar), Cranes attained a front cover with Melody Maker magazine and released a series of critically acclaimed EPs in 1990 and 1991 that preceded their debut full-length album, Wings of Joy, which reached number 52 on the UK Albums Chart. Following a general softening of their sound, the introduction of pop elements to their music, and a world tour with the Cure in 1992, the band's popularity increased, and peaked with the release of the album Forever (UK No. 40), which contained their biggest hit single, "Jewel" (UK No. 29). Loved followed in 1994.

The band fell silent for a period of approximately four years after the release of Population 4 in 1997, and the subsequent closure of Dedicated, with the original line-up disbanding. In 2000, the Shaws formed a new line-up and began writing music again, and released Future Songs and Particles and Waves on their own label, Dadaphonic. These albums signified a change in the overall style of their music, emphasising its ambient, ethereal qualities. Despite heading in a more electronic direction, however, the band's music continued to revolve around Alison Shaw's distinctive singing. In 2002 the band again supported The Cure, at Hyde Park and several European festivals.

Musical style

The band's music has been described as "gothic minimalism", although the band have disputed the "gothic" label. They have also been described as dream pop. In the early 1990s they were briefly included as part of the shoegazing movement of the era.

Much has been made of Alison Shaw's vocals, with descriptions ranging from "the helium tones of a small child", "baby-doll-voiced", and "a mewling, childish wisp of a voice". One reviewer described the band: "Imagine a small child singing lullabies at the bottom of the well with a background of grinding guitars".

Band members

Current members
 Alison Shaw – vocals, bass guitar, acoustic guitar (1985–1997, 2000–present)
 Jim Shaw – guitar, bass guitar, keyboards, drums (1985–1997, 2000–present)
 Paul Smith – guitar, keyboards (1995–1997, 2000–present)
 Ben Baxter – bass guitar (2000–present)
 Jon Mattock – drums (2008–present)

Former members
 Kevin Dunford – lead guitar (1989–1994)
 Mark Francombe – guitar, bass guitar, keyboards, spanner (1989–1997)
 Matt Cope – guitar (1989–1997)
 Manu Ross – drums (1996–1997)
 Jon Callender – drums (2000–2007)

Discography

Cassettes
 Fuse - self-produced demo tape (February 1986)
 Cranes - self-produced demo tape, very limited edition; tracks: "Beachmover" / "Starblood" / "Putsch" / "Focus Breathe" (1988)

Albums 
 Wings of Joy, Dedicated/RCA (September 1991, UK re-issued November 1992 with free 5" 4 track CD single)
 Forever, Dedicated/RCA (April 1993, limited edition CD has 2 bonus tracks)
 Loved, Dedicated/Arista (September 1994)
 La tragédie d'Oreste et Électre, Dedicated/Arista (Limited Edition) (May 1996)
 Population 4, Dedicated/Arista (February 1997)
 Future Songs, Dadaphonic (June 2001)
 Particles & Waves, Dadaphonic - limited edition version contains bonus live DVD (2004)
 Particles & Waves - Instrumentals, Mute Songs/Dadaphonic (2004)
 Cranes, Dadaphonic (2008)

Compilations / live albums
 EP Collection, Vol. 1 & 2, Dedicated (September 1997)
 Live in Italy, Dadaphonic (2003)
 Live at Paradiso 1991, for download only (2007)

Singles and EPs 
 "Self-Non-Self", Bite Back! (May 1989, re-issued on CD with two extra tracks, 12 November 1992)
 "Inescapable, Dedicated – 4 non-album tracks (August 1990)
 "Espero", Dedicated – 3 non-album tracks (November 1990)
 "Adoration", Dedicated – 2 tracks including a non-album B-side (May 1991)
 Tomorrow's Tears, Dedicated – 4 tracks including 2 non-album tracks (August 1991)
 "Starblood (Remix}", Dedicated - limited edition 12" with Wings of Joy album (September 1991)
 "Adrift", Dedicated – 3 tracks including 1 non-album track (March 1993)
 "Jewel", Dedicated/RCA – UK No. 29, 3 different releases with remixes, one of them includes a non-album track (August 1993)
 Forever Remixes, Dedicated – 6 remixes of tracks from the Forever album (1993)
 "Slide", Dedicated - limited edition 3 non-album tracks with Forever album (April 1993)
 Shining Road, Dedicated – UK No. 57, 2 different releases each with 4 tracks with 2 (different) non-album tracks (August 1994)
 "Lilies", Dedicated/Arista (Promotional Only) (1995)
 Can't Get Free, Dedicated – 5 tracks including 4 non-album tracks (May 1997)
 Submarine, Dadaphonic - 8 remixes of a few tracks from the Future Songs album (2002)
 "The Moon City/It's a Beautiful World", Elefant – 2 non-album tracks (7" only, November 2002)

 Notes 
 Cranes first recorded appearance was a track called "Vegetate" for a cassette compilation on Bite Back! named "Against The Tide" (recorded 1985, UK release - February 1986).
 The track "Nothing In The Middle Nothing In The End" first appeared on the Bite Back! compilation album "Make Ready For Revelation" in 1987.
 Cranes contributed a demo of "Cha Cha Escueta" (although named "Untitled" on the sleeve) on the Melody Maker cassette compilation "Gigantic 2" (1990).
 Alison Shaw was the vocalist for the 7" single "Glow" by Inrain on Rough Trade Records, a collaboration with Rudi Tambala of AR Kane (UK release - January 1992).
 The track Astronauts from the 2004 album Particles and Waves has been used as music for the American Express commercial with actress Kate Winslet.
 Alison Shaw recorded a new song Endormie with the group Twine on their last album, Violets.
 The track Shining Road was played in the film Eye for an Eye.
 The television series Californication uses the track Don't Wake Me Up'' during the outro sequence and credits of Season 4, Episode 5.

References

External links
 
  by Alexander Laurence
 
 

Musical groups established in 1989
Musical groups disestablished in 1997
Musical groups reestablished in 2000
English gothic rock groups
Dream pop musical groups
1986 establishments in the United Kingdom
Dedicated Records artists
Musical groups from Hampshire